The 8th Lambda Literary Awards were held in 1996 to honour works of LGBT literature published in 1995.

Special awards

Nominees and winners

References

External links
 8th Lambda Literary Awards

08
Lambda
Lists of LGBT-related award winners and nominees
1996 in LGBT history
1996 awards in the United States